Anthony Janszoon van Salee (1607–1676) was an original settler of and prominent landholder, merchant, and creditor in New Netherland. Van Salee, commonly known as Anthony the Turk, is believed to have been the son of Jan Janszoon, a Dutch pirate captain who lead the Salé Rovers after his capture by Barbary corsairs.

Van Salee and his first wife Grietse were the subject of considerable scandal and litigation in New Amsterdam, leading to his role in the establishment of Gravesend and New Utrecht, as well as other settlements on Long Island.

His mother Margarita was of Moorish background from Spain, and his father converted to Islam upon his capture. Van Salee is recorded as owning a Quran, and was possibly a Muslim himself; if so he may have been the first free Muslim American settler. He may also have had African or Middle Eastern heritage through his mother—while Anthony's line married into white families (with Vanderbilt and other patrician descendants), his apparent brother Abraham's line married into black families.

Early life  

Anthony Janszoon van Salee was Jan Janszoon's fourth child, born in 1607 in Cartagena, Spain, as the second child of his second wife, Margarita, a Moorish woman. Anthony was born only two years before the Expulsion of the Moriscos from Spain, which would have affected many people in his mother's community.

His father Janszoon is believed to have been captured in 1618 by one of the Moorish states on the Barbary Coast.  He "turned Turk" and led the Salé Rovers from 1619, uniting with a pre-expulsion settlement of Moriscos based in that Moroccan city. Known as Admiral Murat Reis, in 1624 his position as governor was acknowledged by Zidan Abu Maali, a de facto recognition of the Republic of Salé city-state. In 1627, the Van Salee family and its operations moved to Algiers.

Van Salee was living near the harbor in Amsterdam when he obtained a marriage license on December 15, 1629, to marry Grietse Reyniers, a 27-year-old German native, two days before his ship left for the New World. In 1630, at the age of 22, Van Salee arrived with his wife in New Netherlands, as a colonist of the Dutch West India Company.

Arrival in New Amsterdam 
Van Salee's pirate father may have provided him a considerable fortune. In 1638, Van Salee acquired a farm on the island of Manhattan which was named "Wallenstein", in memory of Albrecht von Wallenstein, supreme commander of the armies of the Habsburg monarchy. The plot was located on the north side of the defensive stockade across Lower Manhattan, along present-day Wall St. The bouwery was surveyed from Broadway to the East River between Ann Street and Maiden Lane. Van Salee transferred the deed the following year.

At the sale of this property to Cornelis van Tienhoven, it was noted "that he had found 12 apple, 40 peach, 73 cherry trees, 26 sage plants.., behind the house sold by Anthony Janszoon van Salee to Barent Dirksen [Dutchmen],... ANNO 18th of June 1639." This is one of the first references to cherry trees being planted in North America.

By 1639, at the age of 32, Anthony had become one of the largest landholders on the island, as well as a prosperous farmer. His property on Manhattan is included on the Manatus Map of that year.

Initial disputes 
Between 1638 and 1639, the couple accounted for fifteen of ninety-three recorded court cases. During this period, many private quarrels were brought to the Dutch colonial court. The charges against the couple included petty slander, brought by Anneke and Dominee Bogardus (a minister) after Grietse accused of them of lying; Grietse's display of private parts to the naval fleet, and Van Salee's occasions of drunkenness.

Van Salee was engaged in many legal disputes, which ranged from demands for compensation because his dog attacked the hog of Anthony the Portuguese (described as a black townsman), to charges that he had pointed loaded pistols at slave overseers from the Dutch West India Company.

It is unclear to what extent animus against Van Salee's ethnic and religious identity drove these conflicts, or if he was himself reluctant to submit to church authority. Following numerous legal disputes, including with representatives of the Dutch Reformed Church, whose council reprimanded Van Salee and his wife for not behaving as "pious Christians", he was ordered to leave New Netherland.

Turk's Plantation 

After he appealed to the Dutch West India Company, Van Salee was allowed to settle on Long Island. Though his first application for land on Gravesend Bay was not accepted, Director Willem Kieft in 1643 (backdated to 1639) deeded him 100 Morgens —  acquired from Penhawitz in what would become New Utrecht and Gravesend, and specifically in the modern sub-neighborhood of Bath Beach, Brooklyn. Van Salee rented goats for the farm from Andries Hudde. This property was popularly known as the "Turk's plantation", and after a lease to Edmund Audley in 1646 and subsequent sale to Nicholas Stilwell in 1660 (which Van Salee tried to retract) and then Francis de Bruyn in 1664, it became known as Bruynnsberg or the Old Bowery. It also appears that perhaps one of the islands in the bay was known as "Turk's island". He became one of the largest and most prominent landholders on the island, owning the main farm and also a more southerly smaller one to which it was loosely associated, known as "The 12 Morgens". In 1643 his Long Island property was also subject to a raid by the English privateer Seven Stars who stole 200 pumpkins, but abandoned their quest for the hogs on Coney Island after learning that those were owned by Lady Deborah Moody.

The remains of some of his farm buildings were thought to have been uncovered in 1879. Van Salee's 1643 deed to land in Coney Island was acquired by the Brooklyn Historical Society at auction in 2019.

He was the first grantee of land on Conyne Eylandt (Coney Island). Van Salee helped found Long Island settlements including New Utrecht and Gravesend. In 1660 he founded Boswijck (now known as Bushwick), along with twenty-three other settlers, including free blacks Francisco and Anton.

Return to New Amsterdam 
In 1643 Van Salee purchased a house on Bridge Street in New Amsterdam, in defiance of the court order excluding him from that settlement. He became a successful merchant and creditor in New Amsterdam, while owning several properties throughout the region.

Identity and social history 
Van Salee's ethnic and religious background were highly unusual for a prominent colonial landholder, and have led to discussions about his place in social history.

He certainly had a Muslim background, and so is seen as having a place in Muslim American history, but it is unclear if he practiced at all after leaving the Barbary states, or how else this might have influenced his worldview. It is also unclear to what extent he might be considered a multiracial American, and how exactly he was perceived in the racial hierarchy of the time.

It is uncertain how much these identity issues drove Van Salee's social and legal conflicts.

Faith 
A Quran said to have belonged to van Salee was sold in the ca. 1886 estate sale of Joachim Rule, among other heirlooms of the Van Siclen and Gulick families, as documented by descendant Robert Bayles of the Market and Fulton National Bank of New York. Van Salee petitioned to have Christian missionaries assigned to new settlements. Once he was fined for housing an English Quaker at his home on Bridge Street, as they were excluded as Dissenters from the English colony; the man was there to repair a Dutch church.

Van Salee appeared to be on good terms with his neighbor Lady Deborah Moody, the founder of Gravesend. John Edwin Stillwell wrote that Van Salee had disputes with her husband Sir Henry Moody, but he had died in England. Lady Moody was a widow by 1629, a decade before she left England for the Massachusetts Bay Colony, where she lived before settling in New Netherland.

Ethnicity and appearance 
Van Salee was described as unusually tall, with superior strength. He was known as "a 'Turk'" or "semi-Dutchman from Morocco", of "tawny" complexion. He was credited with the "first dwelling erected by Europeans" in what became New Utrecht, about 1643.

Anthony Van Salee's apparent brother, Abraham Janszoon van Salee, a fellow New Netherland settler who was involved in privateering, was described as a "mulatto", in recognition of his mixed-race ancestry, and married a black woman named Fortuyn.

Some descriptions of Abraham Janszoon van Salee include ethnic attributions, such as "Turk", and "Berber". In court records, Van Salee was noted as "Turk", suggesting that record keepers classified him by appearance or culture. Janszoon was known to be the wealthy heir of a former European native head of state, even if his father was associated with privateering on the Barbary Coast. Gomez notes that historic collections devoted to African-centric history have been similarly unable to reach consensus on his appearance, race, or origin.

Marriage, family and descendants 
Van Salee had married Grietse Reyniers in 1629 in Amsterdam; she was born in Germany. The couple had four daughters together. They married into respectable colonial commercial families:
Eva Antonis, married Ferdinandus van Sycklin, an early immigrant to New Netherland and the namesake for Van Siclen Avenue in Brooklyn. She is an ancestor of Robert Bayles, the last descendant to own Van Salee's Qur'an. According to Van Dyck Roberts, she was baptized.
Cornelia, who married William Johnson
Annica, married Thomas Southard. Their daughter Abigail was the great-great-grandmother of Cornelius Vanderbilt
Sara, married John Emans.

Van Salee's first wife Grietse died in 1669. The widower Van Salee married Metje Grevenraet, an ethnic Dutch woman. He passed his final years at his home on Bridge Street, dying in 1676. Metje was a Quaker who helped Van Salee tolerate the church.

Van Salee apparently also had a brother living in the colony, Abraham Janszoon van Salee, who was part-owner of the privateer La Garce. Abraham's descendants included several noted African American figures, including John van Salee de Grasse.

Van Salee's notable descendants include Warren G. Harding, Samuel L. Southard, the Vanderbilts in the United States and Europe, the Whitneys, and the Frelinghuysens. Jacqueline Kennedy Onassis and Humphrey Bogart were claimed as descendants in 2011, but genealogical research in 2022 by Christopher Challender Child of the New England Historic Genealogical Society has shown neither of these two figures are Van Salee descendants.

Notes

References 

1607 births
1676 deaths
American people of Dutch descent
American people of Spanish descent
Dutch expatriates in Morocco
Dutch people of Spanish descent
Moriscos
Moroccan people of Dutch descent
Moroccan people of Spanish descent
People from Cartagena, Spain
People of New Netherland
Moroccan expatriates in the United States